The 1993 Skoda Czech Open, also known as the Prague Open, was a men's tennis tournament played on outdoor clay courts at the I. Czech Lawn Tennis Club in Prague, Czech Republic  that was part of the ATP World Series of the 1993 ATP Tour. It was the seventh edition of the tournament and was held from 2 August until 8 August 1993. First-seeded Sergi Bruguera won the singles title.

Finals

Singles

 Sergi Bruguera defeated  Andrei Chesnokov 7–5, 6–4
 It was Bruguera's 4th singles title of the year and the 10th of his career.

Doubles

 Hendrik Jan Davids /  Libor Pimek defeated  Jorge Lozano /  Jaime Oncins 6–3, 7–6

References

External links
 ITF tournament edition details

Czech Open
Prague Open (1987–1999)
Czechoslovak Open